The following table shows the men's heptathlon world record progression starting in 1970 and ratified by IAAF from 1986.

Record progression

See also
 Women's heptathlon world record progression
 Decathlon world record progression

References

Heptathlon, men
Heptathlon